Crista is an internal compartment formed by the inner membrane of a mitochondrion.

Crista may also refer to:
 Crista (given name)
 Crista Ministries, a collection of Christian ministries in Shoreline, Washington

In anatomy:
 Crista ampullaris, a sensory organ of the internal ear
 Crista dividens, a structure in the developing heart of the human embryo
 Crista frontalis, the frontal crest, a structure of the skull
Crista galli, a structure of the ethmoid bone
 crista interfenestralis, an anatomical feature that separates the inner ear in two found in some reptiles
 Crista occipitalis interna, the internal occipital crest, a structure in the skull
 Crista terminalis, a crest structure in the heart

In species:
 Gyraulus crista, a minute species of freshwater snail
 Ptilium crista-castrensis, a moss species

See also
 Crest (disambiguation)
 Christa (disambiguation)
 Crist (surname)
 Cristi
 Cristy
 Krista, a female given name
 Crista-galli (disambiguation)